Anita Brodén (born 1948) is a Swedish Liberal People's Party politician, member of the Riksdag since 2002.

External links

Anita Brodén at the Riksdag website

1948 births
Living people
Members of the Riksdag from the Liberals (Sweden)
Women members of the Riksdag
Members of the Riksdag 2002–2006
Members of the Riksdag 2006–2010
Members of the Riksdag 2010–2014
21st-century Swedish women politicians